St Barbara Limited is an Australian-based, Australian Securities Exchange-listed (ASX) gold producer and explorer.

History
The company was incorporated and listed in 1969 as Endeavour Oil and initially focused on mineral exploration and production from assets located in Western Australia. In 2005, the company acquired the Southern Cross, Leonora and South Laverton gold assets from Sons of Gwalia Limited. St Barbara's high-grade Gwalia Gold Mine at Leonora was commissioned in October 2008. 

In 2012, St Barbara acquired Allied Gold Mining Plc and its gold operations at Simberi in Papua New Guinea and Gold Ridge in the Solomon Islands. Operations at Gold Ridge in the Solomon Islands were suspended in April 2014 due to torrential rainfall and ensuing flooding. The Gold Ridge Project was sold to a Solomon Islands company associated with local landowners in May 2015.

In May 2019, St Barbara bought Canadian Atlantic Gold Corp for Can$722 million ($536 million), adding a mine in Canada.

Operations
St Barbara's mines include the Gwalia Gold Mine in Leonora, Western Australia, and the Simberi open-pit gold mine in Papua New Guinea.

See also
Gold mining in Western Australia
Open-pit mining
Underground mining

References

External links
St Barbara Ltd company profile at Bloomberg

Gold mining companies of Australia
Companies listed on the Australian Securities Exchange
Gold mining in Western Australia
Companies based in Western Australia
1969 establishments in Australia